The Juno Award for "Blues Album of the Year" has been awarded since 1994, as recognition each year for the best blues album in Canada. The award used to be a combined blues and gospel award category.

Winners

Best Blues/Gospel Album (1994–1997)

Best Blues Album (1998–2002)

Blues Album of the Year (2003–present)

References

Blues Album
Blues music awards
Canadian blues
Album awards